Sigaloseps conditus is a species of skink found in New Caledonia.

References

Sigaloseps
Reptiles described in 2014
Skinks of New Caledonia
Endemic fauna of New Caledonia
Taxa named by Ross Allen Sadlier
Taxa named by Aaron M. Bauer
Taxa named by Perry L. Wood